Shooting sports at the 1966 Asian Games was held in Sport Authority of Thailand Sport Complex Shooting Range, Bangkok, Thailand from 11 to 17 December 1966. Shooting comprised seven individual and seven team events for a total of fourteen events, all open to both men and women.

Japan dominated the competition by winning seven gold medals.

Medalists

Medal table

References 

 ISSF Results Overview

External links
Asian Shooting Federation

 
1966 Asian Games events
1966
Asian Games
1966 Asian Games